Stephanie Mack is an American who worked in fashion.

Biography 
Mack attended Nightingale-Bamford, a small, expensive private school, from kindergarten through high school.
She earned a college degree at Franklin & Marshall in Pennsylvania.

After graduation, in 1996, she took a job as an editorial assistant at George magazine. The magazine went out of business in 2001, and she started working as an assistant to Narciso Rodriguez, a fashion designer.

A friend set her up on a blind date with the recently divorced Mark Madoff, and the pair married in 2003. Her boss, Rodriguez, designed her wedding gown.

She and Madoff had two children, born in 2006 and 2009.

Her father-in-law, Bernie Madoff, had been a highly respected financier, until the collapse of the real-estate bubble, in 2008. He had been a swindler and had been running one of the longest-running Ponzi schemes, and the most successful in history, until the bubble's collapse. On December 10, 2008, Madoff informed his wife, Ruth Madoff, Mark Madoff, and his younger son Andrew Madoff that he had been a swindler.

Bernie Madoff was arrested, tried, and given a long sentence. Mack's husband and his brother, uncle, and a variety of cousins had all worked for her father-in-law's firm, without knowing of the swindle. Nevertheless, the rest of the family was subjected to unpleasant scrutiny and suspicion. Her husband Mark died by suicide on December 10, 2010, the second anniversary of her father-in-law's confession.

In 2011, Mack published a memoir about her life so far, The End of Normal.

In 2012, Mack and Deborah Madoff, the estranged wife of her brother-in-law Andrew Madoff, were sued by Irving Picard, to recover funds to pay back her father-in-law's swindled clients. They reached settlements with the trustee in 2017. The bankruptcy judge ruled that Susan Elkins, her husband's first wife, had acquired her fortune early enough that she got to keep it.

References 

Living people
1984 births
21st-century American women writers
Madoff family
Franklin & Marshall College alumni
Writers from Manhattan
Nightingale-Bamford School alumni